Quebec Barracks may refer to:

 Aldershot Garrison, in South East England
 Osnabrück Garrison, Osnabrück, Germany
 Simpson Barracks, Northamptonshire, England

Aldershot Garrison